Helmut Hauptmann (born 12 March 1928) is a German writer who was mainly active in the then East Germany.

Life
Helmut Hauptmann grew up in a working-class family in Berlin-Kreuzberg.  Near the end of World War II, he served as a Luftwaffenhelfer in Berlin and became a Prisoner of war at a camp in Schleswig-Holstein.  After the Abitur, he worked with the Magistrate of Greater Berlin.  Since the early 1950s, he has worked as a literary editor, journalist, and writer in Berlin.

Hauptmann writes narrative works that reflect the ideological optimism of early East Germany as well as travel journals which captured the experience of the writer in the Eastern Bloc.

Hauptmann was a member of the Schriftstellerverband der DDR since 1956 and the P.E.N.-Zentrum of East Germany since 1972.  He is the recipient of the Erich Weinert Medal (1958), the Heinrich Mann Prize (1960), the art prize of the Free German Trade Union Federation (1964), and as well as the Heinrich Heine Prize (1969).

Hauptmann and his wife Ursula currently live in Berlin-Weißensee.

Works
 Das Geheimnis von Sosa (The Secret of Sosa), Berlin 1950
 Studiert wie Angelika und Hans Joachim! (Study like Angelika and Hans Joachim!), Berlin 1951
 Schwarzes Meer und weiße Rosen (Black Sea and White Roses), Berlin 1956
 Donaufahrt zu dritt (Donau Trip for Three), Berlin 1957
 Die Karriere des Hans Dietrich Borssdorf alias Jakow (The Career of Hans Dietrich Borssdorf alias Jakow), Berlin 1958
  (The Invisible with the Red Hat), Berlin 1958
 Sieben stellen die Uhr (The Clock hits Seven), Berlin 1959
 Hanna, Berlin 1963
 Das komplexe Abenteuer Schwedt (The Complex Adventurer Schwedt), Halle (Saale) 1964
 Der Kreis der Familie (The Family Circle), Halle 1964
 Blauer Himmel, blaue Helme (Blue Heavens, Blue Helmets), Halle (Saale) 1965
 Ivi, Halle (Saale) 1969
 Warum ich nach Horka ging (Why I go to Horka), Bautzen 1971
 Das unteilbare Leben (The Indivisible Life), Halle (Saale) 1972
 Standpunkt und Spielraum (Standpoint and Scope), Halle (Saale) 1977

Editorial work
 DDR-Reportage, Leipzig 1969

External links
 

1928 births
Living people

Heinrich Mann Prize winners
German male writers
Luftwaffenhelfer
German prisoners of war in World War II held by the United Kingdom